The women's doubles Tournament at the 1983 Virginia Slims of Atlanta took place between April 25 and May 1 on outdoor hard courts in Atlanta, United States. Alycia Moulton and Sharon Walsh won the title, defeating Rosemary Casals and Wendy Turnbull in the final.

Seeds

Draw

References
 Main Draw, ITFTennis.com

Virginia Slims of Atlanta - Doubles